Microphora is a genus of flies in the family Athericidae.

Species
Microphora angustifrons Kröber, 1912

References

Athericidae
Brachycera genera
Taxa named by Otto Kröber
Diptera of Australasia